

This is a list of the National Register of Historic Places listings in Rutherford County, Tennessee.

This is intended to be a complete list of the properties and districts on the National Register of Historic Places in Rutherford County, Tennessee, United States. Latitude and longitude coordinates are provided for many National Register properties and districts; these locations may be seen together in a map.

There are 49 properties and districts listed on the National Register in the county, and five former listings.

Current listings

|}

Former listings
Five other properties have previously been listed, but were removed:

|}

See also

 List of National Historic Landmarks in Tennessee
 National Register of Historic Places listings in Tennessee

References

Rutherford
 
Buildings and structures in Rutherford County, Tennessee